Alejandro "Álex" Suárez Cardero (born 25 August 2003) is a Spanish footballer who plays as a central midfielder for Real Oviedo Vetusta.

Club career
Born in Oviedo, Asturias, Suárez joined Real Oviedo's youth setup from Juventud Estadio CF. He made his senior debut with the reserves on 18 October 2020, starting in a 0–1 Segunda División B home loss against UP Langreo.

Suárez made his first-team debut on 29 May 2021, coming on as a late substitute for Alejandro Arribas in a 2–2 home draw against CD Tenerife in the Segunda División.

References

External links

2003 births
Living people
Footballers from Oviedo
Spanish footballers
Association football midfielders
Segunda División players
Segunda División B players
Real Oviedo Vetusta players
Real Oviedo players